Lei Chunmei (born January 1959) is a Chinese politician of She ethnic heritage currently serving as the head of the United Front Work Department in Fujian, a province in southeastern China, and a member of the provincial Party Standing Committee. She has been a standing committee member since January 2015.

Early life 
In January 1959, Lei was born in Fu'an County, Fujian province China. Lei is Chinese with ancestry of the She (畲) People.

Education 
Lei has a degree in mechanical engineering from Fuzhou University. Lei has a master's degree in economics from Xiamen University.

Career 
After joining the Communist Party of China in 1978, Lei has successively served as the vice mayor of Ningde, the head of the Communist Youth League provincial organization in Fujian, the vice mayor of Fuzhou, the mayor of Longyan, and the party chief of Nanping. 

In 2012, Lei became head of the provincial party organization's United Front Department.

Lei is an alternate member of the 17th and the 18th Central Committees of the Communist Party of China.

References 

People from Fu'an
1959 births
Living people
Political office-holders in Fujian
Chinese women in politics
Fuzhou University alumni